Dúber Armando Quintero Artunduaga (born 23 August 1990 in Gigante, Huila) is a Colombian cyclist, who competed professionally for UCI Professional Continental team  from 2013 to 2014.

Major results
2007
 1st  Road race, National Junior Road Championships
2012
 1st Coppa Festa in Fiera San Salvatore
 1st Targa Crocifisso
2014
 1st Stage 1 Tour de Langkawi

References

1990 births
Living people
Colombian male cyclists
21st-century Colombian people